Storybook International (also known as Stories and Fables) is a British children's television series, produced for ITV by Harlech Productions, a part of HTV and written by Barry Levinson and Virginia Boston. The weekly, half-hour show was a collection of folk tales and fairy stories from all over the world, based on an anthology of stories for children published by Gollancz in 1981, edited by Veronica Kruger.

Filmed in such locales as Russia, Ireland and Scandinavia, the series' live-action playlets were based on stories which originated in England, Czechoslovakia, France, Romania, Turkey, Wales, Israel, Norway, China, Africa, India and elsewhere. A few of the stories were campfire legends derived from the Native Americans of New England and the Maori of New Zealand.

Broadcasting
First broadcast in 1983, it consisted of 65 episodes, aired as three separate seasons. Although its distribution was originally confined to Britain and Europe, Storybook International enjoyed extensive cable play in the US, Scandinavia and the Middle East in subsequent decades. In 1984 they released Stories and Fables under the Walt Disney Home Video. Fitfully released on VHS throughout the 1980s and 1990, the full series was finally made available on DVD in 2006.

Theme song
The show famously began with an animated title sequence with a troubadour singing the theme song, The Storyteller, accompanied by a friendly anthropomorphic fox. The original version was sung in a traditional English folk style, but subsequent international versions had different versions of the song. Notably the US version replaced the line "In England I am John" with "In America I'm John".

References

1983 British television series debuts
1986 British television series endings
British children's fantasy television series
ITV children's television shows
Television series by ITV Studios
Television shows produced by Harlech Television (HTV)
English-language television shows